Henryk Bobula (4 March 1920 – 4 May 1998) was a Polish footballer. He played in five matches for the Poland national football team in 1948.

References

External links
 

1920 births
1998 deaths
Polish footballers
Poland international footballers
Raków Częstochowa managers
Association football forwards
Sportspeople from Omsk